Notes from the Underbelly is an American sitcom that was aired on ABC from 2007 to 2008, originally debuting as a mid-season replacement. The series is based on the 2005 novel of the same name by Risa Green, and was produced by Eric and Kim Tannenbaum (previously producing Two and a Half Men) for Warner Bros. Television.  The title is a parody of Dostoevsky's novel Notes from Underground.

Originally, it was supposed to debut on October 5, 2006, along with Big Day, but ABC made a last-minute change in its schedule by moving Ugly Betty to Thursday, thus replacing both sitcoms. After numerous scheduling changes prior to the shows premiere, the show premiered Thursday, April 12, 2007 at 10:00PM Eastern/9:00PM Central, and moved to its regular Wednesday timeslot at 8:30PM Eastern/7:30PM Central on April 18.

Notes from the Underbelly began its second season on November 26, 2007 in the new timeslot of 9:30PM Eastern/8:30PM Central on Mondays, leading out of fall's second highest rated freshman sitcom, Samantha Who?.

On May 13, 2008, ABC canceled the series after two seasons.

In Russia, all 23 episodes of the series were shown on NTV.

Plot 
The series chronicles the life of Andrew and Lauren, a couple who are expecting their first child, and the unlikely help and advice of their family and friends who also want to share in the couple's joy and pains on the road to parenthood.

Cast and characters 

Despite playing parents on the series, the majority of the cast had little real life experience with pregnancy.

Main crew 
Bari Halle
Livia Hanich
Stacy Traub
Barry Sonnenfeld
Eric Tannenbaum
Kim Tannenbaum
Greg Schaffer
Jana Hunter
Gary Murphy
John Quaintance
Lesley Wake
Dan Kopelman
Mitch Hunter
Steve Joe
Diane Mercer
Steve Schaffer
Russ Woody

Episodes

Season 1 (2007)

Season 2 (2007–08)

American ratings 
Seasonal rankings (based on average total viewers per episode) of Notes from the Underbelly on ABC:

Note: Each U.S. network television season starts in late September and ends in late May, or occasionally early June, which coincides with the completion of May sweeps.

The second season performance is current as of January 20, 2008

References

External links 

Jennifer Westfeldt interview from FOX LA morning show

American Broadcasting Company original programming
2000s American single-camera sitcoms
2007 American television series debuts
2008 American television series endings
Pregnancy-themed television shows
Television shows based on American novels
Television series by Warner Bros. Television Studios
Television shows set in Los Angeles